The 1910 Chalmers Award scandal was an incident in which a Major League Baseball team, the St. Louis Browns, tried but failed to give Nap Lajoie the batting title over Ty Cobb.

Background

Before the 1910 Major League Baseball season, Hugh Chalmers of the Chalmers Automobile Company announced a promotion in which a Chalmers Model 30 automobile would be given to the batting champions for Major League Baseball's American and National Leagues.

At the start of the final day of the season, Ty Cobb of the Detroit Tigers held a slim lead in the race for the American League batting title, just a few percentage points ahead of the Cleveland Naps' Nap Lajoie. Cobb was generally disliked by opponents, whereas Lajoie was more popular.

Controversy
Cobb did not play in the Tigers' final two games of the season, and he finished with a batting average of .385.

Lajoie played in a doubleheader on the last day of the season against the St. Louis Browns. Browns manager Jack O'Connor ordered rookie third baseman Red Corriden to play on the outfield grass.  This all but conceded a hit for any ball Lajoie bunted. Lajoie had eight hits in eight at bats and finished the season with a .384 batting average (227 hits in 591 at-bats). His final at-bat resulted in a wild throw to first base, which was scored as an error. Under baseball rules, when a player reaches base on an error, it is treated as a hitless at-bat, thus lowering his batting average.

Aftermath
After news broke of the scandal, a writer for the St. Louis Post claimed: "All St. Louis is up in arms over the deplorable spectacle, conceived in stupidity and executed in jealousy."  The issue was brought to American League president Ban Johnson, who declared all batting averages official, and Cobb the champion (.385069 to .384095).  Chalmers, however, awarded automobiles to both Cobb and Lajoie (essentially declaring a tie). O'Connor and coach Harry Howell, who tried to bribe the official scorer to change the error to a hit, were banned from baseball for their role in the affair.

Chalmers gave an award to the league's most valuable player the following season instead of the player with the highest batting average. Cobb won the Chalmers Award in 1911 in his best year, hitting .420. Chalmers continued the award through the 1914 season, after which it was discontinued. Chalmers ceased to exist in 1923, although it was a predecessor to the modern company Chrysler. Cobb and Lajoie were eventually elected into the Baseball Hall of Fame.

Modern revision
In 1978, sports statistician Pete Palmer discovered a 1910 discrepancy in Cobb's career hit total, and the story was broken by The Sporting News in April 1981. Cobb is credited with 4,191-lifetime hits (still the total on MLB.com), but researchers say that a 1910 Detroit Tigers box score was counted twice in the season-ending calculations. The mistake caused the statisticians to give Cobb an extra 2-for-3. This credited Cobb with two non-existent hits and erroneously raised his 1910 batting average from .383 to .385.  As Lajoie had a .384 average for the season, the revised figure would have cost Cobb one of his 12 batting titles, reduced his career average to .366, and given the 1910 batting championship to Lajoie. The mathematical mistake was described by one writer as follows: "It could be said that 1910 produced two bogus leading batting averages and one questionable champion."

References

Chalmers Award, 1910
Major League Baseball controversies
Chalmers
Sports betting scandals
Ty Cobb